BB19 may refer to:

Big Brother 19 (disambiguation), a television program in various versions 
, a United States Navy battleship